Verbrugghe is a surname. Notable people with the surname include:

Albert Verbrugghe, Belgian crime victim
Brecht Verbrugghe (born 1982), Belgian footballer
Henri Verbrugghe (1929–2009), Belgian sprint canoer
Ief Verbrugghe (born 1971), Belgian cyclist
Rik Verbrugghe (born 1974), Belgian cyclist